On the Night of the Fire, released in the United States as The Fugitive, is a 1939 British thriller film, directed by Brian Desmond Hurst and starring Ralph Richardson and Diana Wynyard.  The film is based on the novel of the same name by F. L. Green.  It was shot on location in Newcastle upon Tyne and was released shortly after the outbreak of World War II.  It is regarded as an early example of British film noir, with the kind of subject matter and filming style which fell completely out of favour during the war years – when British studios felt that cinemagoers would want either light entertainment and escapism or topical patriotic propaganda pieces – and would not be taken up again until the later 1940s.

Film critic David Quinlan describes the film as "grim but gripping".  Andrew Spicer, in his book European Film Noir, writes: "A riveting psychological study. With its sustained doom-laden atmosphere, Krampf’s expressive cinematography, its adroit mixture of location shooting and Gothic compositions and Richardson’s wonderful performance as a lower middle-class Everyman, On the Night of the Fire clearly shows that an achieved mastery of film noir existed in British cinema".

Plot
Struggling Tyneside barber, Will Kobling (Richardson), is in financial trouble.  One evening, opportunistically and on impulse, he steals £100 from a factory where a window has been left open.  He hopes the money will represent a new start for him and wife Kit (Wynyard).  His hopes are dashed when Kit confesses to being in debt to the local draper, Pilleger (Henry Oscar), who has been pressuring her to settle it.  Most of the stolen cash has to go on this.

Pilleger banks the money, only for the police to inform him that the serial numbers of the notes match those stolen from the factory.  He professes himself an innocent party, claiming not to know which of his customers they came from, and the police have to let the matter drop.  Pilleger blackmails Kobling, promising silence in return for £3 per week.  Kobling is horrified at this indefinite burden, but feels obliged to consent.

Some time later, and facing the loss of his business through lack of ready cash, Kobling decides to challenge Pilleger.  An opportunity presents itself when a fire breaks out, distracting the police and public.  He confronts Pilleger and a fight breaks out, ending in Pilleger's death.  The police suspect that Kobling is involved and use psychological tactics to break him down, but he remains grimly silent and sends Kit and their baby to stay with her sister.

Kobling was seen at Pilleger's store on the night of his murder by Lizzie Crane (Mary Clare), a well-known eccentric, who talks about what she saw.  The populace shun Kobling and call for justice, but the police do not believe Lizzie's word will stand up as evidence.  As they continue to put pressure on him, Kobling approaches breaking point.  He finally cracks when he is told that Kit has been killed in a road accident.

Cast
 Ralph Richardson as Will Kobling
 Diana Wynyard as Kit Kobling
 Romney Brent as Jimsey Jones
 Mary Clare as Lizzie Crane
 Henry Oscar as Pilleger
 Dave Crowley as Jim Smith
 Gertrude Musgrove as Dora Smith
 Frederick Leister as Inspector
 Ivan Brandt as Wilson
 Sara Allgood as Charwoman
 Glynis Johns as Mary Carr
 Amy Dalby as Hospital Nurse 
 Irene Handl as Neighbour 
 Maire O'Neill as Neighbour

References

External links 
 
 On the Night of the Fire at BFI Film & TV Database
 Newcastle in Film: On the Night of the Fire 
 www.briandesmondhurst.org- official legacy website of the director with filmography including On the Night of the Fire

1939 films
1930s psychological thriller films
British thriller films
Films directed by Brian Desmond Hurst
British black-and-white films
Films set in Newcastle upon Tyne
Films shot in Tyne and Wear
Films scored by Miklós Rózsa
Films with screenplays by Patrick Kirwan
Films based on British novels
Film noir
1930s English-language films
1930s British films